is a railway station in the city of Yurihonjō, Akita Prefecture,  Japan, operated by JR East.

Lines

Station layout
The station has one side platform and one island platform connected by a footbridge. The station is attended.

Platforms

History
Nishime Station opened on June 30, 1922 as a station on the Japanese Government Railways (JGR) Rikuusai Line, serving the village of Nishime, Akita. It was switched to the control of the JGR Uetsu Main Line on April 20, 1924. The JGR became the JNR (Japan National Railway) after World War II. With the privatization of the JNR on April 1, 1987, the station came under the control of the East Japan Railway Company. A new station building was completed in February 2006.

Passenger statistics
In fiscal 2018, the station was used by an average of 294 passengers daily (boarding passengers only).

Surrounding area

See also
List of railway stations in Japan

References

External links

 JR East Station information 

Railway stations in Japan opened in 1922
Railway stations in Akita Prefecture
Uetsu Main Line
Yurihonjō